Ein Gedi race, also known as the Shalom Marathon – Dead Sea Half Marathon is an Israeli road running event  held by the Tamar Regional Council since 1983. It is billed as the "lowest race on earth".

History
In 1997, the race was held in memory of Giora and Tomer Ron. The winner was Kenya's Bernard Boiya, with Morocco's Chaham el Matti coming in second.

In 1999, the Palestinian Authority flag flew at the race as a symbol of peace and brotherhood.

Since 2004, handcycling has grown in popularity at the race.

In 2010, three runners were airlifted to hospitals after suffering heatstroke during the race.

See also
Sports in Israel

References

Marathons in Israel
Dead Sea
Recurring sporting events established in 1983
Tourist attractions in Southern District (Israel)